American actress and singer Bella Thorne has released two extended plays, fourteen singles, five featured singles, one promotional single, and thirteen music videos. Thorne's first single, "Watch Me", featuring Zendaya was released on June 21, 2011 and reached number 86 on the US Billboard Hot 100 charts and number nine on the US Top Heatseekers charts, and was certified gold by RIAA in 2013. Her second single, "TTYLXOX", was released on March 6, 2012, reaching number 97 on the Billboard Hot 100.

In March 2013, Bella Thorne announced she had signed to Hollywood Records, and began working on material for her debut album. On May 2, 2014 it was revealed her debut album would be titled Call It Whatever and on May 14 she released the single "Call It Whatever". On October 15, 2014 Thorne revealed her debut album had been canceled and she released an EP, Jersey, on November 17, 2014 instead.

In March 2018, Thorne started her own record label, Filthy Fangs, for which she will release her debut album, What Do You See Now? through.

Albums

Studio albums

Extended plays

Singles

As main artist

As featuring artist

Promotional singles

Other charted songs

Other appearances

Music videos

References

External links
 
 Thorne Kids at Life.com

Discography
Thorne, Bella
Discographies of American artists